Anolis pumilus, the Cuban spiny-plant anole, is a species of lizard in the family Dactyloidae. The species is found in Cuba.

References

Anoles
Reptiles described in 1988
Endemic fauna of Cuba
Reptiles of Cuba
Taxa named by Orlando H. Garrido